The Austria national under-21 football team is the national under-21 football team of Austria and is controlled by the Austrian Football Association.

This team is for Austrian players aged 21 or under at the start of a two-year European Under-21 Football Championship campaign, so players can be, and often are, up to 23 years old.

Staff

 Head coach: Werner Gregoritsch
 Assistant coach: Dietmar Pegam	
 Goalkeeper coach: Raimund Hedl

Players

Current squad
 The following players were called up for the friendly matches.
 Match dates: 17 and 21 November 2022
 Opposition:  and 
 Caps and goals correct as of: 27 September 2022, after the match against .

Recent call-ups
The following players have also been called up to the squad in the last twelve months and are still eligible for selection.

Recent and forthcoming fixtures

2021

2022

Former coaches
  Gustl Starek (1985–1987)
  Ernst Weber (1996–1999)
  Willibald Ruttensteiner (2001–2005)
  Gerhard Hitzel (2005)
  Willibald Ruttensteiner (2005–2006)
  Manfred Zsak (2006–2009)
  Andreas Herzog (2009–2011)

See also

Austria national football team
Austria national under-17 football team

References

External links
UEFA Under-21 website

F
European national under-21 association football teams